Mamadou Obbi Oularé (born 8 January 1996) is a Belgian professional footballer who plays as a striker for RWD Molenbeek, on loan from Championship club Barnsley. He is the son of former professional Guinean footballer Souleymane Oularé.

Club career

Club Brugge
Oularé came through the youth ranks at Lille OSC and signed for Belgian side Club Brugge in 2013. He made his Belgian Pro League debut on 14 September 2014 against K.R.C. Genk. He replaced Nikola Storm after 64 minutes.
His first league start came on 21 September 2014 against K.V. Kortrijk, in which he also scored his first league goal in a man of the match performance. On 20 August 2015, while playing for Club Brugge, Oularé tweeted an apology for his lackluster performance coming off the bench against Manchester United in a Champions League playoff game at Old Trafford. Earlier that day, it was widely reported in the Belgian press that Club Brugge's manager Michel Preud'homme had given Oularé a dressing down in front of his teammates in the dressing room after that game.

Watford
On 1 September 2015, Oularé signed for Premier League side Watford for an undisclosed fee rumored to be around £6m on a five-year contract. He made his debut for the club in an FA Cup tie against Newcastle United on 9 January 2016. He was substituted at half time.
He made his Premier League debut, against Swansea City in a 1–0 Watford defeat, coming on as a substitute for Valon Behrami in the 87th minute.

Barnsley
On 26 July 2021, Oularé signed a three-year contract with EFL Championship side Barnsley. On 1 February 2022, Oularé returned to his native Belgium by joining Belgian First Division B side RWD Molenbeek on loan for the remainder of the 2021–22 season.

Career statistics

Honours
Club Brugge
 Belgian Cup: 2014–15

References

External links

1996 births
Living people
Belgian footballers
Belgian expatriate footballers
Belgian expatriate sportspeople in England
Association football forwards
Belgian Pro League players
Premier League players
Eredivisie players
Club Brugge KV players
Watford F.C. players
S.V. Zulte Waregem players
Willem II (football club) players
Royal Antwerp F.C. players
Standard Liège players
Barnsley F.C. players
RWDM47 players
English Football League players
Belgium youth international footballers
Belgium under-21 international footballers
Expatriate footballers in England
Expatriate footballers in the Netherlands
Belgian people of Guinean descent
Wasquehal Football players
People from Waregem
Footballers from West Flanders